China Practical Shooting Association (CPSA) (Chinese 中国实用射击总会) is the Mainland China region for practical shooting under the International Practical Shooting Confederation.

See also 
 IPSC Action Air

References

External links 
 Official homepage of China Practical Shooting Association

Regions of the International Practical Shooting Confederation
Sports organizations of China